Suchart Tancharoen (陳素察, born 11 February 1958) is a Thai politician from the Palang Pracharath Party. He is currently serving as First Deputy Speaker of the House of Representatives.

References 

Living people
Hainanese people
1958 births
Suchart Tancharoen
Suchart Tancharoen
Suchart Tancharoen
Suchart Tancharoen